Tammun is a Palestinian town in the Tubas Governorate, located 13 kilometers northeast of Nablus and five kilometers south of Tubas in the northeastern West Bank. Tammun has a population of approximately 10,795 inhabitants in 2007.

History
Biblical scholar van de Velde suggested in 1854 that Tammun was the Biblical town of Tabbath in Ephraim; however, Tabbath is now identified with a site in Jordan. The town's name derives from the Arabic word tammen, meaning "quiet".

Ottoman era
Tammun's modern history dates from the 15th century. The town was founded by a group of Bedouins from the Arabian Peninsula seeking to find a safe location in Palestine with a view of other nearby localities. In 1596 it appeared in the Ottoman tax registers as "Tammun", in the nahiya of Jabal Sami in the liwa of Nablus. It had a population of 15 households and 3 bachelors, all Muslim. The villagers paid a fixed tax rate of 33.3% on wheat, barley, summer crops, olive trees, occasional revenues, goats and beehives; a total of 5,450 akçe.

Over the past four centuries, Arabs from the towns of Kafr Qaddum and Halhul have settled in the town.

In 1882, the PEF's Survey of Western Palestine described Tammun  as "A good-sized village at the foot of the mountain, with open ground to the north. The village stands high, with olives to the south.

British  Mandate of Palestine era
In the 1922 census of Palestine, conducted by the British Mandate authorities, Tammun had a population of 1,345, all Muslim. This had increased in the 1931 census of Palestine, when Tammun, (including Atuf), had 316 occupied houses and a population of 1,599, again all Muslim.

In the 1945 statistics the population was 2,070 Muslims, with 98,080 dunams of land, according to an official land and population survey. 393 dunams were used for plantations and irrigable land, 33,181 dunams for cereals, while 157 dunams were built-up (urban) land.

Jordanian era
In the wake of the 1948 Arab–Israeli War, and after the 1949 Armistice Agreements, Tammun came under Jordanian rule. It was annexed by Jordan in 1950.

The Jordanian census of 1961 found 2,593 inhabitants in Tammun.

1967, and aftermath
Since the Six-Day War in 1967, Tammun has been under Israeli occupation.

Geography and climate
Tammun stands at an elevation of 332 meters above sea level. It is five kilometers south of Tubas, twenty-three kilometers northeast of Nablus, and bordered by Far'a and Wadi al-Far'a to the west and an-Naseriya to the south.

The town's total land area is about 81,000 dunams, accounting for more than 15% of the Tubas Governorate's jurisdiction. About 1,519 dunams are designated as 'built up' area, while 79,481 dunams are used for agricultural purposes, are covered by forests or are classified as closed-off areas controlled by the Israel Defense Forces.

The average temperature in Tammun is 20 degrees Celsius. The town receives an average annual rainfall of 331 millimeters and the average humidity rate is 57%.

Demographics
According to the 1997 census by the Palestinian Central Bureau of Statistics (PCBS), Tammun had a population of 7,640, of whom 3,771 were males and 3,869 were females. The age distribution of the town's inhabitants was 45% under the age of 15, 49.9% between the ages of 15 and 4.6% were above the age of 65.

According to the PCBS, Tammun had a population of 10,795 inhabitants in the 2007 census. The growth of inhabitants from 1997 and 2005 was 32.1%. Its population constituted over 21% of the entire population of the Tubas Governorate, making it the second largest city after Tubas. Tammun's residents generally are from two Arab families: Bani Odeh and Bsharat.

Economy
Prior to the 1967 Six-Day War, Tammun's residents mostly relied on farming and raising livestock. Since 1967 to the First Intifada, work has shifted to Israel where many laborers were employed. The Palestinian National Authority, which gained civil control over Tammun in 1995, has provided more job opportunities in the public sector and trade. After the outbreak of the Second Intifada in 2000, labor shifted once again to agriculture.

Currently, 50% work in agriculture, 35% work in the Israeli labor market, 10% in services, 2% in construction and 3% in trade. In 2006, there were 212 shops, eight restaurants, a wheat mill, a pickle factory and other industries such as cheese and jam production. In 1997, Tammun's labor force made up 67% of the town's population. However, 66.3% were non-economically active. Women constituted 34% of the labor force. Tammun's average income dropped from 1,500 NIS before 2000 to 600 NIS in 2004 — a decrease of 60%.

Tammun has a total of 25,000 dunams of cultivated land, of which 4,166 are grown with fruit orchards, 3,560 for field crops, 600 dunams for vegetables and 120 are used for greenhouses. According to the Palestinian Ministry of Agriculture, Tammun produces five tonnes of olives, 3,500 tonnes of vegetables and 2,500 tonnes of field crops per annum. Around 10% of Tammun's residents own livestock which consists of 137 herds of cattle, 480 goats, 5,250 sheep, 37,000 poultry and 138 beehives for honey.

Government
Tammun was transferred to the Palestinian National Authority on November 13, 1995 and was originally governed by a village council. Since 1997, Tammun has been governed by a municipal council with fifteen elected members, including the mayor. The municipality is in charge of Tammun's administration, planning and development, social services, infrastructural maintenance, utilities, solid waste collection and issuing of building licenses. In the 2005 Palestinian municipal elections, Muhammad Ahmad Bsharat was elected mayor.

Education
In 1997, 84.3% of Tammun's population over the age of 10 was literate. Women made up 80% of the illiterate residents. About 17% of the population over the age of 18 had completed their secondary and high school education, 20% completed primary and secondary education and 27.2% completed just their primary education.

There are seven schools and six kindergartens in the town, all administered by the Education Ministry of the Palestinian National Authority. Of the seven schools, three were all-male schools, two were all women and two were co-ed. In 2004-05, 3,091 students were enrolled in these schools. There was a total of 395 children in Tammun's kindergartens.

References

Bibliography

External links
Welcome To Tammun
Survey of Western Palestine, Map 12:    IAA, Wikimedia commons
Tammun (Fact Sheet),  Applied Research Institute–Jerusalem (ARIJ)
Tammun Village Profile, ARIJ

Tubas Governorate
Towns in the West Bank
Municipalities of the State of Palestine